This list of recipients of the Silver Buffalo Award includes people who have been awarded the highest commendation of the Boy Scouts of America. Since the Silver Buffalo Award was first awarded in 1926, 764 have been presented as of 2016.



1926
During the first presentation in 1926, twenty-two awards were presented in a particular order determined by Chief Scout Executive James E. West.

1927

1928

1929

1930

1931

1932

1933

1934

1935

1936

1938

1940

1941

1942

1943

1944

1945

1946

1947

1948

1949

1950

1951

1952

1953

1954

1955

1956

1957

1958

1959

1960

1961

1962

1963

1964

1965

1966

1967

1968

1969

1970

1971

1972

1973

1974

1975

1976

1978

1980

1981

1982

1984

1986

1988

1990

1992

1993

1994

1995

1996

1997

1998

1999

2000

2001

2002

2003

2004

2005

2006

2007

2008

2009

2010

2011

2012

2013

2014

2015

2016

2017

2018

2019

2020

2021

2022

2023

Notes

References

Advancement and recognition in the Boy Scouts of America
Lists of award winners
Lists of people involved in Scouting